Park is an unincorporated community in Richland Township, Greene County, Indiana.

History
Park was named for the Parker family of pioneer settlers. A post office was established at Park in 1866, and remained in operation until it was discontinued in 1908.

Geography

References

Unincorporated communities in Greene County, Indiana
Unincorporated communities in Indiana
Bloomington metropolitan area, Indiana